Takht-e Chenar (also Romanized as Takht-e Chenār) is a village in Saidabad Rural District, in the Jajrud District of Pardis County, Tehran Province, Iran. At the 2006 census, its population was 102, with 34 families.

References 

Populated places in Tehran County